Two Idiots in Hollywood is a 1988 comedy film written and directed by actor Stephen Tobolowsky, based on his stage play of the same name. It stars Jim McGrath and Jeff Doucette.

Premise
Taylor and Murphy leave their small town existence in Ohio for the glamour of Hollywood. Taylor, completely without talent, becomes a successful television producer, while Murphy is tried for a murder he didn't commit.

Principal cast
 Jim McGrath as Murphy Wegg
 Jeff Doucette as Taylor Dup 
 Cheryl Anderson as Marianne Plambo 
 Lisa Robins as NBA Casting Secretary 
 Kurtwood Smith as Defense Attorney 
 M. C. Gainey as Sgt. Albert

Critical reception
The film was critically panned. From Chris Willman of The Los Angeles Times:

References

External links 

1988 films
1988 comedy films
American films based on plays
New World Pictures films
1988 directorial debut films
1980s English-language films